Maggie is an unincorporated community in west-central Craig County, Virginia, United States.  It lies along Dicks Creek Road.

References

Unincorporated communities in Craig County, Virginia
Unincorporated communities in Virginia